Tandi is a rural municipality in Morang District in the Kosi Zone of south-eastern Nepal. At the time of the 1991 Nepal census it had a population of 7919 people living in 1410 individual households.

References

Village development committees in Morang District
Miklajung, Morang